Rafflesia mira is a member of the genus Rafflesia. It is endemic to the rainforest of Mindanao, Philippines and can only be found in the vicinity of Mount Candalaga, Compostela Valley province.  The species was described later in 2005 by Madulid et al., as R. magnifica, but this name is a later synonym. According to the IUCN the species is found in only one unprotected locality: Mt.Candalaga Range in Maragusan, Compostela Valley, where the individuals are distributed in small groups. A road infrastructure project is planned on part of the mountain. Moreover, the lower mountain slopes are being converted into banana plantations. Currently there are not any protective measures in place.

References

External links
 Parasitic Plant Connection: Rafflesia mira page

mira
Endemic flora of the Philippines
Flora of Mindanao
Critically endangered plants